Events from the year 1953 in Pakistan.

Incumbents

Federal government
 Governor-General: Malik Ghulam Muhammad
 Prime Minister: Khawaja Nazimuddin (until 17 April), Muhammad Ali Bogra (starting 17 April)
 Chief Justice: Abdul Rashid

Governors
 Governor of Northwest Frontier: Khwaja Shahabuddin 
 Governor of West Punjab: I. I. Chundrigar (until 2 May); Mian Aminuddin (starting 2 May)
 Governor of Sindh: 
 until 2 May: Mian Aminuddin
 2 May-12 August: George Baxandall Constantine
 until 12 August: Habib Ibrahim Rahimtoola

Events
 April 17 – Governor General Ghulam Muhammad sacked Prime Minister Khawaja Nazimuddin, although he enjoyed the confidence of the parliament, and appointed Mohammad Ali Bogra to form a government on April 17.
 Martial law was imposed in Lahore to control the sectarian riots against the Ahmadiyya Muslim Community. This was the first sectarian rioting in the country and the Pakistan Army was called for the first time to control a civil strife.

Births
 June 21 – Benazir Bhutto, politician and Prime Minister of Pakistan (died 2007)

See also

 Other events of 1953
 List of Pakistani films of 1953
 Timeline of Pakistani history

References

 
Persecution of Ahmadis in Pakistan
1953 in Asia